Dun Mill Lock is a lock on the Kennet and Avon Canal, near Hungerford, Berkshire, England.

The lock has a rise/fall of 5 ft 8 in (1.73 m).

It is a grade II listed building.

References

See also 
Locks on the Kennet and Avon Canal

Grade II listed buildings in Berkshire
Locks on the Kennet and Avon Canal
Locks of Berkshire
Grade II listed canals